Open Letter is the third album by English big band Loose Tubes, that was released on the EG label in 1988.

Reception
Allmusic awarded the album with 3 stars.

Track listing
 "Sweet Williams" (Django Bates) – 8:54 
 "Children's Game" (Eddie Parker) – 5:27
 "Blue" (Steve Berry) – 5:52
 "Shadow Play" (Parker) – 5:40
 "Mo Mhuirnin Ban" (Trad, arr. Chris Batchelor) – 3:37
 "Sticklebacks" (Batchelor) – 4:24
 "Accepting Suites from Strangers" (Bates) – 7:39
 "The Last Word" (Parker) – 6:39
 "Open Letter to Dudu Pukwana" (Dave DeFries) – 6:39

Personnel
Eddie Parker – flute, bass flute
Dai Pritchard – clarinet, bass clarinet
Iain Ballamy – alto and soprano saxes and flute
Steve Buckley – alto and soprano saxes and penny whistle 
Mark Lockheart – tenor and soprano saxes
Tim Whitehead – tenor sax
Julian Argüelles – soprano and baritone saxes
Dave DeFries – trumpet, flugelhorn and percussion
Chris Batchelor – trumpet
Lance Kelly – trumpet, flugelhorn
John Eacott – trumpet, flugelhorn, bugle, clay trumpet
Richard Pywell – alto trombone, tenor trombone
John Harborne – tenor trombone, flugelbone
Steve Day – tenor trombone, euphonium
Ashley Slater – bass trombone, tuba
Dave Powell – tuba
Django Bates – keyboards, tenor horn
John Parricelli – guitar
Steve Berry, bass
Steve Argüelles – drums, percussion 
Thebe Lipere – percussion

References

1988 albums
Loose Tubes albums
Albums produced by Teo Macero
E.G. Records albums